Karl Jaeger or Karl Jäger may refer to:

Karl Jäger (1888–1959), Nazi leader and mass murderer
Karl Jäger (artist) (1833–1887), German painter
Karl Jaeger (educator) (1930–2015), American educator

See also

 
 
 Charles de Jaeger (1911–2000), BBC cameraman
 Charlie Jaeger (1875–1942), Major League Baseball player
 Chuck Yeager (1923–2020), United States Air Force officer and record-setting test pilot
 Jäger (disambiguation) (surname)
 Karl (disambiguation)